Trichembola unimaculata is a moth in the family Gelechiidae. It was described by Mikhail Mikhailovich Omelko and Natalia Viktorovna Omelko in 1993. It is found in Korea and the Russian Far East.

References

Trichembola
Moths described in 1993